Nikola Raspopović (born 18 October 1989) is a Serbian professional footballer who will plays for Malaysian side FELDA United as a defender, for 2020 Malaysian Super League seasons.

Career
Born in Belgrade, Raspopović spent the final years of his formation at Rad. He was promoted to their senior squad in the 2007–08 season, but failed to make a competitive appearance. Subsequently, Raspopović was loaned to Serbian League Belgrade clubs Šumadija Jagnjilo and Sopot in order to gain experience. He returned to Rad ahead of the 2009–10 season, making his debuts in the Serbian SuperLiga. During his spell with the Građevinari, Raspopović amassed 107 league appearances and scored three goals.

In the summer of 2015, Raspopović moved abroad to Turkey and joined Gaziantep BB. He was transferred to fellow TFF First League club Adana Demirspor in June 2016.

In the 2017 summer transfer window, Raspopović returned to Serbia and signed with Radnički Niš. 

On 5 September 2018, he joined Dukla Prague. After 13 games, the club announced on 15 April 2019, that they had terminated the contract by mutual consent for family reasons.

References

External links
 
 
 

1989 births
Living people
Footballers from Belgrade
Serbian footballers
Association football defenders
Serbian expatriate footballers
Serbian expatriate sportspeople in Turkey
Expatriate footballers in Turkey
Expatriate footballers in Belarus
Expatriate footballers in the Czech Republic
Expatriate footballers in Malaysia
Serbian SuperLiga players
TFF First League players
Czech First League players
FK Rad players
FK Sopot players
Gaziantep F.K. footballers
Adana Demirspor footballers
FK Radnički Niš players
FC Shakhtyor Soligorsk players
FK Dukla Prague players
Felda United F.C. players